The Colegio de Belén located between 45th and 66th streets – situated next door to the Tropicana nightclub –  in Marianao, Havana, was designed in 1925 by the architect Leonardo Morales y Pedroso and his brother the engineer Luis Morales y Pedroso of the firm Morales y Compañía Arquitectos.

History

Her Majesty Isabella II, Queen of Spain, issued a royal charter in the year 1854 founding the Colegio de Belén (Belen School) in Havana, Cuba. Belen began its educational work in the building formerly occupied by the convent and convalescent hospital of Our Lady of Belen in Havana Vieja. A meteorological observatory was established in 1857. A facility was built in 1896.

The building was constructed on sixty acres of land that had been donated and was to be used as the main building of the Colegio de Belén. The original building, a convent in Havana Vieja had been opened in 1854 within the premises of the formerly occupied convent and convalescent hospital of Our Lady of Belen. Those premises had become unsuitable and badly located due to the change of atmosphere in the neighborhood and the growth of the city. The project was designed by the Cuban architectural firm of Morales & Cia (architect Leonardo Morales y Pedroso and Engineer Luis Morales y Pedroso) in 1925, with an unlimited budget for designing a religious school, the Colegio de Belén, Havana.

From 1925 to 1961, and located in the Marianao municipality, on an area of approximately 190,000 m2, emerged in the twenties of the last century, the new building with plans approved in Rome by Wlodimiro Ledochowsky, General of the Society of Jesus, in June 1921.

In mid-1923 the construction of this property was started, carried out by the company of architects and engineers Morales y Compañía Arquitectos, being built nine radiating pavilions, a central chapel of three floors, an entrance pavilion that had a fourth level where it was located the observatory. Its inaugural activities were carried out on December 19, 20 and 21, 1925, beginning its first course in January 1926.
The result was a monumental pan-optical edifice with an extensive neoclassical façade perpendicular to the large chapel and four large courtyards, recalling the building housing the convent in Havana Vieja, with three stories of porticoed galleries to link nine radial pavilions, the appearance is of instrumentality which is supported both in the design resources and the unusual dimensions of the spaces. The structure is built from the concrete-covered steel structure, the flooring, covered with tiles, and the roof are monolithic reinforced concrete slabs.

Chapel

The chapel was centrally located in plan, it had a wide central nave of triple height with a mural by Hipolito Hidalgo de Caviedes (1901–1994). It had two side aisles. El Colegio de Belen was known as "The Palace of Education."

1961

In 1961 the government of Fidel Castro (himself a graduate of Belen) confiscated all private and religious schools in Cuba. Castro expelled the Jesuits and declared the government of Cuba an atheist government. Castro's government nationalized businesses and banks, confiscating more than $1 billion in American-owned property. Thousands of those dubbed “enemies of the revolution” were executed or imprisoned, and the school curriculum was reshaped by communist doctrine. Free speech was not an option, and the Cuban socialist press was an extension of the government.

Rectors in the first Belen school
Calle Compostela, between Luz y Acosta (Havana, 1854-1925).
1.  Bartolomé Munar (1854-1857)
2.  Manuel Solís Pajares (Interino 1857-1858)
3.  José María Lluch (1858-1862)
4.  Buenaventura Feliú (1862-1868)
5.  Andrés García Rivas (1868-1874)
6.  Angel Rosendo Gallo (1874-1881)
7.  Tomás Ipiña (1881-1885)
8.  Isidoro Zameza (1885-1889)
9.  Benigno Iriarte (1889-1893)
10. José María Palacio (1893-1899)
11. Vicente Leza (1899-1908)
12. Silverio Eraña (1908-1909)
13. Fernando Ansoleaga(1909-1915)
14. Antonino Oráa (1915-1918)
15. Pedro Abad 1918-1922
16. Claudio García Herrero (1922-1924)
17. Camilo García (1924-1925)

Rectors in the new premises of Marianao
18. Antonio Galán (1925-1930)
19. Enrique Carvajal (1930-1931)
20. Ignacio Francia (1931-1938)
21. Ramón Calvo Hernández-Agero (1938-1940)
22. Daniel Baldor de la Vega (1940-1947)
23. Ceferino Ruiz Rodríguez (1947-1953)
24. Miguel Angel Larrucea de la Mora (1953-1956)
25. Eduardo Martínez Márquez (1956-1959)
26. Daniel Baldor de la Vega(1959)
27. Ramón Calvo Hernández(1959-1961)

Academics

Politicians, Cuba

Scientists

Gallery
Images from the 1940s and 50s of the Colegio de Belen:

See also

 Nuestra Señora de Belén
 Belen Jesuit Preparatory School
 List of Belen Jesuit Preparatory School people
 List of Jesuit sites
 Instituto Técnico Militar
 List of Belen Jesuit Preparatory School people*
 Leonardo Morales y Pedroso
 Tropicana Club

Notes

References

Bibliography
 La Habana, Guia de Arquitectura, Maria Elena Zequeira & Eduardo Luis Rodriguez Fernandez, editors (Sevilla, Spain: A.G. Novograf, S.A., 1998)

External links
 The Society of Jesus’ Contemporary History in Cuba
 El Colegio de Belén – Escuelas de La Habana
 El célebre observatorio de los jesuitas en La Habana
 Antiguo Convento de Belén hoy proyecto humanitario y museo de la meteorología en La Habana

 RELIGIOUS REPRESSION IN CUBA: Its Evolution and Present Status

Buildings and structures in Havana
Education in Havana
Schools in Havana
Educational institutions established in 1925
Schools in Cuba
Neoclassical architecture in Cuba
1925 establishments in Cuba

Architecture in Havana